KYBB (102.7 FM, "B102.7") is a radio station in Sioux Falls, South Dakota (licensed by the Federal Communications Commission (FCC) to Canton, South Dakota), airing a classic rock format. The station is owned by Townsquare Media.

Its studios are located on Tennis Lane in Sioux Falls, while its transmitter is located on Southeastern Avenue just south of Sioux Falls.

External links
B102.7 Website

YBB
Classic rock radio stations in the United States
Radio stations established in 2001
2001 establishments in South Dakota
Townsquare Media radio stations